The 1973 BC Lions finished in third place in the Western Conference with a 5–9–2 record. They beat the Calgary Stampeders in the final game of the regular season to make the playoffs.  However, the Lions would lose to Saskatchewan in the Western Semi-Final 33–13.

In April, the Lions traded star fullback Jim Evenson to Ottawa. This would result in more carries for sophomore Johnny Musso, star running back from University of Alabama, who the Lions outbid the Chicago Bears of the NFL in 1972. Musso didn't disappoint as he ran for 1029 yards in 1973, had 475 yards receiving and scored 10 touchdowns.

Third year starting quarterback Don Moorhead split time with back-up Karl Douglas as the Lions tried to find the solution to their stagnant offence which produced only 16.3 points per game. In aggregate, both quarterbacks could only generate eight touchdowns through the air all season.

Sophomore linebacker Ray Nettles won the Schenley award for Most Outstanding Defensive Player and was the only Lion named to the CFL all-star team.

Linebacker Greg Findlay retired after 12 seasons and 178 games for the Lions.

Offseason

CFL Draft

Preseason

Regular season

Season standings

Season schedule

Playoffs

Offensive leaders

Awards and records
CFL's Most Outstanding Lineman Award – Ray Nettles (LB)

1973 CFL All-Stars
LB – Ray Nettles, CFL All-Star

References

BC Lions seasons
1973 Canadian Football League season by team
1973 in British Columbia